Joanne Therese Duncan (born 1 May 1959) is an Australian politician. She was a Labor Party member of the Victorian Legislative Assembly from 1999 to 2014, representing Macedon from 2002.

Education

Duncan was born in Melbourne, Victoria and attended St Columba's in Essendon 1970–76. In 1977 she became an audio-visual tech. In 1988 she received a Bachelor of Education from Melbourne College of Advanced Education and became a teacher/librarian.

Political career

In 1999, Duncan was preselected as the Labor candidate for the Liberal-held seat of Gisborne, held by retiring Liberal incumbent  Tom Reynolds.  Duncan defeated Liberal MLC Rob Knowles on a swing of nine percent. Her victory was part of an unexpected swing to Labor in country Victoria that allowed Steve Bracks to win government.  The seat was abolished in 2002, and Duncan followed most of her constituents into Macedon, which she represented until her retirement in 2014.

References

|-

1959 births
Living people
Members of the Victorian Legislative Assembly
Australian Labor Party members of the Parliament of Victoria
21st-century Australian politicians
Women members of the Victorian Legislative Assembly
21st-century Australian women politicians